Corneliu E. Giurgea (6 January 1923, Bucharest – 30 December 1995, Brussels) was a Romanian psychologist and chemist. In 1964 he synthesised Piracetam, which he has described as a nootropic.

Giurgea coined the term nootropic in 1972.

Nootropic characteristics
He stated that nootropic drugs should have the following characteristics:

 They should enhance learning and memory.
 They should enhance the resistance of learned behaviors/memories to conditions which tend to disrupt them (e.g. electroconvulsive shock, hypoxia).
 They should protect the brain against various physical or chemical injuries (e.g. barbiturates, scopalamine).
 They should increase the efficacy of the tonic cortical/subcortical control mechanisms.
 They should lack the usual pharmacology of other psychotropic drugs (e.g. sedation, motor stimulation) and possess very few side effects and extremely low toxicity.

Biography
He received a Ph.D. in medicine from the University of Bucharest, where he also taught for several years. He continued his research and specialisation in Psychology (doc) at the First Pavlov State Medical University of St. Peterburg, under some of Ivan Pavlov's closest collaborators such as Pyotr Kupalov. He was then a post-doc at the University of Rochester and subsequently a professor at the Université catholique de Louvain and scientific counselor and researcher at the Belgian pharmaceutical company UCB.

Books and articles
Le Vieillissement Cerebral: Normal Et Reussi, Le Defi Du XXIe Siecle 1993 
L'heritage De Pavlov: Un Demi-Siecle Apres Sa Mort 1986 
Fundamentals to a pharmacology of the mind 1981 
Articles: PubMed Central, Google Scholar.

References

1923 births
1995 deaths
Romanian psychologists
Romanian chemists
Jewish chemists
Romanian pharmacologists
University of Bucharest alumni
Academic staff of the University of Bucharest
Academic staff of the Université catholique de Louvain
20th-century psychologists
Romanian expatriates in the Soviet Union
Romanian expatriates in the United States
Romanian expatriates in Belgium